Ushan Imantha (born 26 July 1999) is a Sri Lankan cricketer. He made his Twenty20 debut on 6 January 2020, for Kandy Customs Cricket Club in the 2019–20 SLC Twenty20 Tournament.

References

External links
 

1999 births
Living people
Sri Lankan cricketers
Kandy Customs Sports Club cricketers
Place of birth missing (living people)